The following is an episode list for the Israeli sitcom Naor's Friends.

Series overview

Episodes

Season 1 (2006)

Season 2 (2009)

Season 3 (2011)

Season 4 (2017)

External links
 

Lists of sitcom episodes
Lists of Israeli television series episodes